White Day is celebrated annually on March 14, one month after Valentine's Day, when people give reciprocal gifts to those who gave them gifts on Valentine's Day. It began in Japan in 1978; its observance has spread to several other Asian nations and countries worldwide.

Origin 
Though Valentine's Day was first attempted to be celebrated in Japan in 1936, it did not begin to be popularly celebrated until the 1970s, giving the day a different observation from in the West. It was primarily an opportunity for girls to show that they like a boy. In 1977, a Fukuoka-based confectionery company, Ishimuramanseido, marketed marshmallows to men on March 14, calling it . White Day was first celebrated in 1978 in Japan. The National Confectionery Industry Association started it as an "answer day" to Valentine's Day on the grounds that men should pay back the women who gave them chocolate and other gifts on Valentine's Day.

Soon thereafter, confectionery companies began marketing white chocolate. Now, men give both white and dark chocolate, as well as other edible and non-edible gifts, such as jewelry or objects of sentimental value, or white clothing like lingerie, to women from whom they received chocolate on Valentine's Day one month earlier. Flowers and other gifts are also given on this day.

Observation 
White Day is celebrated one month after Valentine's Day, on March 14. In countries that observe White Day, typically Valentine's Day is celebrated by women and girls presenting chocolate gifts (either store-bought or handmade), usually to the other men and boys, as an expression of love, courtesy, or social obligation.

Gift exchanges happen between romantic partners, friends, and coworkers. Traditionally, popular White Day gifts include food like white chocolate, marshmallows, candy, cookies, and other "white" accessories like jewelry, bags, lotions, and lingerie. Nowadays, gifts do not have to be white.

Sometimes the term  is used to describe the generally recited rule for men that the return gift should be two to three times the worth of the Valentine's gift they received.

In the latter half of the 2010s, sales figures indicated a decline in the popularity of the observation. It was seen as a result of reduced sales of obligation chocolates on Valentine's Day. Another reason given for the reduction of popularity is the changing gender roles within Japanese culture.

International observation 
Outside of Japan, the practice of giving response gifts one month after Valentine's Day has spread internationally. In those cultures, White Day is, for the most part, observed similarly. Some places where this occurs include China, South Korea, Taiwan, and Vietnam.

See also 
 Giri (Japanese)
 Hallmark holiday
 Pi day, also observed on March 14 (represented as 3/14 in month-day format)
 International Marriage Day, the coincidental day when international marriages were first legalized in Japan

References

External links 

Japanese popular culture
South Korean popular culture
Chinese popular culture
Taiwanese culture
East Asian culture
Unofficial observances
March observances
Chocolate industry
Intimate relationships
Giving
1978 introductions
Days celebrating love
Love